Christine Namaganda (born in 1986) is a Ugandan chess player. She attained Woman Fide Master status in 2015.

Education 
Namaganda studied for a master's degree at Makerere University.

Chess career 
Namaganda attained fide Arbiter trainer status in 2016. She also travelled to Ivory Coast to train the youth how to play chess. She has represented Uganda in various international tournaments such as CommonWealth games in India, 43rd Batumi Olympiad. She has also won several local women's tournaments, over seven times. She also emerged victor of the women's day tournament, Queens of Chess.

In 2016 she rejected the Uganda Sports Press Association identification of Joyce Kabengano as the Best Female Chess Player of the Year, claiming she ranked higher.

See also 

 Uganda Chess Federation
 Woman Fide Master
 International Federation of Chess
 Ivy Claire Amoko
 Gloria Nansubuga

References 

Ugandan female chess players
Academic staff of Makerere University
Living people
1986 births
Ugandan chess players
Chess Woman FIDE Masters